TeleEye Group, is a Hong Kong based audio-visual, information technology company, founded in 1994. The primary products of the group are network CCTV and DVR applications. The TeleEye Group is the first company to become a publicly traded company arising from the support of a Hong Kong public university and the Hong Kong government through the Business Incubation Programme. (Mak 43) Today, the TeleEye Group of products is available internationally in 25 countries.

History
The TeleEye group was founded by engineering researchers from the City University of Hong Kong.

Products
The most notable products of the Group include the TeleEye and the CAMERIO.

References

Mak, Ka-Ho and Jason Tan. Globalization and Marketization in Education: A Comparative Study of Hong Kong and Singapore. United Kingdom: G.P. Edward Elgar Publishing.

External links
Official English Site

Information technology companies of Hong Kong